The New York State Office for People With Developmental Disabilities (OPWDD) is an executive agency in the state of New York, whose mission is to provide services and conduct research for those with intellectual disabilities and developmental disabilities (I/DD). It is one of New York State’s largest agencies, with a mandate to provide services and supports to more than 130,000 people with intellectual or developmental disabilities and leads a workforce of more than 22,000 direct support staff, clinicians, nurses, researchers and other professionals throughout the state. It operates 13 Developmental Disabilities Services Offices (DDSO) which operate group homes for the individuals with intellectual and developmental disabilities in its care. Prior to July 2010, the agency was named the Office of Mental Retardation and Developmental Disabilities (OMRDD).

The agency is based in Albany, New York at 44 Holland Avenue.

The New York State Office for People With Developmental Disabilities Police (NYSOPWDD Police) is responsible for providing onsite security services at the 13 field offices located in New York State. They also transport people with Developmental Disabilities patients to and from court and other OPWDD facilities. OPWDD Safety and Security Officers have New York State peace officer status which grants them limited powers of arrest under the Mental Hygiene Law (section 13.25), Public Health Law (section 455), and Criminal Procedure Law (section 2.10-12). The NYS Office for People with Developmental Disabilities uses the title "Safety and Security Officer" for its OPWDD officers.

The New York State Office for People With Developmental Disabilities Police Safety and Security Officers are prohibited by New York State Law and ( OPWDD ) policy to use or carry a firearm, but do carry a expandable baton, handcuffs, mace, bulletproof vests, flashlight, and a radio that is directly linked to other officers and the main office of the facility. The Civil Service title used by the New York State Department of Civil Service for OMH Police is "Safety and Security Officer". There are three titles (referred to as ranks) within the agency:

Promotional exams are routinely given to obtain promotional opportunities.
New Safety and Security officer must complete the "Peace Officer Basic Course" which includes training in:

After training each new Safety and Security officer completes a minimum six week on-the-job field training supervised by a senior officer from their respective facility.

Some of the duties performed by these officers include, but are not limited to, enforcing state and local laws, protecting persons and property, prevent and detect crime, search for and eliminate contraband, performing escorts of patients to off-site facilities, apprehending absconded patients and executing Mental Hygiene warrants.

Safety and Security Officers are also responsible for conducting fire service procedures which include conducting fire drills, fire safety classes, fire extinguisher inspections and building inspections. Furthermore they maintain peace, safety and security in their assigned facilities.

References

External links
 Official OPWDD site
 Department of Mental Hygiene in the New York Codes, Rules and Regulations
 Office for People With Developmental Disabilities on DATA.NY.GOV

State agencies of New York (state)
Year of establishment missing
Organizations based in Albany, New York